Maroney is a surname. It may refer to:

 Denman Maroney (born 1949), American jazz musician
 Jason Maroney (born 1967), Australian shooter
 Jenna Maroney (born 1969), fictional character in the TV series 30 Rock
 Kelli Maroney (born 1965), American actress
 Laurence Maroney (born 1985), American player of American Football
 Mike Maroney (born 1968), American politician
 McKayla Maroney (born 1995), American gymnast
 Nicholas Maroney, Australian basketballer
 Susie Maroney (born 1974), Australian swimmer
 Thomas Maroney (1895–1971), American racewalker

See also
 Moroney
 Moroni (disambiguation)
 Morony